France competed at the 2017 World Championships in Athletics in London, United Kingdom, from 4–13 August 2017.

Medalists

Results

Men
Track and road events

Field events

Combined events – Decathlon

Women
Track and road events

Field events

Combined events – Heptathlon

References

Nations at the 2017 World Championships in Athletics
World Championships in Athletics
France at the World Championships in Athletics